{{DISPLAYTITLE:C5H5N5}}
The molecular formula C5H5N5 (molar mass: 135.13 g/mol, exact mass: 135.0545 u) may refer to:

 Adenine
 2-Aminopurine

Molecular formulas